The Hagenbach-Bischoff quota (also known as the Newland-Britton quota or the exact Droop quota, as opposed to the more common rounded Droop quota) is a formula used in some voting systems based on proportional representation (PR). It is used in some elections held under the largest remainder method of party-list proportional representation as well as in a variant of the D'Hondt method known as the Hagenbach-Bischoff system. The Hagenbach-Bischoff quota is named for its inventor, Swiss professor of physics and mathematics Eduard Hagenbach-Bischoff (1833–1910)

The Hagenbach-Bischoff quota is sometimes referred to as the 'Droop quota' and vice versa (especially in connection with the largest remainder method) because the two are very similar. However, under the Hagenbach-Bischoff and any smaller (e.g. the Imperiali) quota it is theoretically possible for more candidates to reach the quota than there are seats, whereas under the slightly larger Droop quota, this is mathematically impossible. Some scholars of electoral systems argue that the Hagenbach-Bischoff quota should be used for elections under the single transferable vote (STV) system, instead of the Droop quota, because in certain circumstances it is possible for the Droop quota to produce a seemingly undemocratic result. In practice the two quotas are so similar that they are unlikely to produce a different result in anything other than a very small or very close election.

Formula
The Hagenbach-Bischoff quota may be given as:

where:

Total votes = the total valid poll; that is, the number of valid (unspoilt) votes cast in an election.
Total seats = the total number of seats to be filled in the election.

The Droop quota's formula is slightly different in that the quotient arrived at by dividing the total vote by the number of seats plus 1 is rounded up if it is fractional, or if it is a whole number, 1 is added, so that in either case the quotient is increased to the next whole number.

An example of use in STV
To see how the Hagenbach-Bischoff quota would work in an STV election imagine an election in which there are 2 seats to be filled and 3 candidates: Andrea, Carter, Brad. There are 100 voters who vote as follows:

Because there are 100 votes cast, and 2 seats, the Hagenbach-Bischoff is:

To begin the count the first preferences cast for each candidate are tallied and are as follows:

 Andrea: 45
 Carter: 25
 Brad: 30

Andrea has more than 33⅓ votes. She therefore has reached the quota and is declared elected. She has 11⅔ votes more than the quota. These votes are transferred to Carter so the tallies become:

 Carter: 36⅔
 Brad: 30

Carter has now reached the quota so he is declared elected. The winners are therefore Andrea and Carter.

Advantage over the Droop quota
Some voting systems experts, such as Christine Cierra Danica, have observed that in an STV election held under the Droop quota it is sometimes possible for a group of candidates supported by a majority of voters to receive only a minority of seats. Such an outcome is far more likely under the older Hare quota but can still occur under the Droop quota in rare circumstances. It is a possibility that is only completely eliminated by use of the Hagenbach-Bischoff quota. The problem is best illustrated by an example.

Scenario
Imagine an election in which there are 7 seats to be filled. There are 8 candidates standing, in two groups: Andrea, Carter, Brad and Delilah are members of the Alpha party; Scott, Jennifer, Matt and Susan are members of the Beta party. There are 104 voters and they vote as follows:

It can be seen that supporters of the Alpha party all rank all four Alpha party candidates higher than any of the Beta party candidates (the last four preferences of the voters are not shown above because they will not affect the result of the election). Similarly, voters who support the Beta party all give their first four preferences to Beta party candidates. Overall, the Alpha party receives 53 votes out of a total of 104. The Alpha party therefore has a majority of one. The Beta party receives a minority share of the vote.

Below the election results are shown first under the Droop and then under the Hagenbach-Bischoff quota. 

It can be seen that under the Droop quota (14), despite having the support of a majority of voters, the Alpha party receives only a minority of seats. When the same election is conducted under the Hagenbach-Bischoff quota, however, the Alpha party's majority is rewarded with a majority of seats.

Count under the Droop quota
The Droop quota is calculated as 14. 
When first preferences are tallied Andrea, Carter and Brad (all from the Alpha party) have all reached a quota and are declared elected. However none of them has a surplus. The tallies of the remaining candidates are therefore:
Delilah (Alpha party): 11
Scott (Beta party): 13
Jennifer (Beta party): 13
Matt (Beta party): 13
Susan (Beta party): 12

No candidate has reached a quota so Delilah, who is the candidate with the fewest votes, is excluded. Because there are only four seats left to fill, and only four candidates remain in the contest, all four are declared elected. The elected candidates are Andrea, Carter and Brad (from the Alpha party), and Scott, Jennifer, Matt and Susan (from the Beta party).

Count under the Hagenbach-Bischoff quota
The Hagenbach-Bischoff quota is calculated as 13.
When the first preferences are tallied Andrea, Carter and Brad (from the Alpha party) and Scott, Jennifer and Matt (from the Beta party) have all reached the quota and all six are declared elected. However this time the three elected Alpha party candidates each has a surplus of 1. These surpluses all transfer to Delilah so the tallies of the remaining candidates become:
Delilah (Alpha party): 14
Susan (Beta party): 12
Delilah has now reached a quota and is declared elected.

The elected candidates are Andrea, Carter, Brad and Delilah (from the Alpha party) and Scott, Jennifer and Matt (from the Beta party).

Disadvantage of Hagenbach-Bischoff quota
In STV-like system with larger quotas (such as Hare or Droop), the typical rule is that candidates are elected when their number of votes equals or exceeds the quota. If this rule is used with the Hagenbach-Bischoff quota, it is possible that more candidates are elected than there are seats; the simplest example of this would be a single-winner election where two parties each receive half of the votes. Imagine an election with three candidates for two positions where the 300 votes are 

The Hagenbach-Bischoff quota is 300/(2+1) = 100. In the first round Andrea is elected with 200 preferences, while Brad (75) and Carter (25) remain in contention. Andrea's surplus of 100 is transferred: 25 to Brad and 75 to Carter, bringing each of them to 100. So all three have achieved the quota and so should be elected even though there are only two positions to fill.

This problem is easily resolved, as suggested by Irwin Mann in 1973, by adjusting the rule so candidates are only elected when their number of votes strictly exceeds the quota (not necessarily by so large a fraction as to reach the Droop quota).

Alternatively, B. L. Meek proposed treating the result as an n+1-way tie, and eliminating one of the candidates at random; still another solution would call for a runoff between the candidates.

Ties can occur in STV vote counts, especially when eliminating candidates during the process. A common rule is that a tie between two candidates is resolved by seeing which one had more first-choice preferences. In which case Brad, with 75 first choice preferences, would win the last open seat.

See also
 CPO-STV
 Schulze STV

References

Electoral system quotas